Douglas Davies (10 March 1881 – 22 December 1949) was a South African cricketer. He played in six first-class matches from 1902/03 to 1913/14.

References

External links
 

1881 births
1949 deaths
South African cricketers
Border cricketers
Gauteng cricketers
Western Province cricketers
Sportspeople from Qonce